Ronald Howard Jirsa (born December 21, 1959) is an American college basketball coach who is currently an assistant coach at UNC Greensboro. He was previously the head coach at Georgia and Marshall.

Early life and education
Jirsa was born in New London, Connecticut and grew up in nearby Ledyard. After graduating from Ledyard High School in 1977, Jirsa attended Gettysburg College. A member of the basketball team, Jirsa graduated from Gettysburg in 1981 with a Bachelor of Arts degree in biology.

Coaching career
Jirsa bounced around as an assistant coach, but had two significant stints at the University of Tulsa, first under J. D. Barnett  from 1985 to 1988 and second under Tubby Smith from 1991 to 1993. Jirsa completed his Master of Arts degree in athletic administration at Tulsa in 1987 while an assistant coach there. Smith promoted Jirsa to associate head coach in 1994, and Jirsa followed Smith to the University of Georgia.

When Smith departed for the University of Kentucky in 1997, Jirsa remained at Georgia and became head coach. Although Jirsa led Georgia to  third  place in the 1998 National Invitation Tournament title in his first season, he was fired in 1999 after going 35-30.

Jirsa moved to Dayton and was an assistant for four seasons there. In June 2003, he was hired to coach Marshall. Jirsa was fired after four seasons at Marshall, going 43-74.  Most recently, he served under Tubby Smith as an assistant at the University of Minnesota. On March 25, 2013, it was announced that Smith, along with his entire staff had been relieved as coaches at Minnesota.

In the 2013–14 season, Jirsa was recruiting coordinator at Division III Bethel University in Minnesota. The following season, Jirsa joined Steve Payne's coaching staff as an assistant at Tennessee Tech. In 2015, Jirsa made yet another move, this time as an assistant at Radford under Mike Jones, following Jones to UNCG when Jones was named head coach there in 2021.

Head coaching record

References

External links
 Radford Highlanders bio
 Tennessee Tech Golden Eagles bio
 Minnesota Golden Gophers bio
 Marshall Thundering Herd bio
 Dayton Flyers bio
 Georgia Bulldogs bio

1959 births
Living people
American men's basketball coaches
American men's basketball players
Basketball coaches from Connecticut
Basketball players from Connecticut
Connecticut College Camels men's basketball coaches
Dayton Flyers men's basketball coaches
Delaware Fightin' Blue Hens men's basketball coaches
Gardner–Webb Runnin' Bulldogs men's basketball coaches
Gettysburg Bullets men's basketball players
Georgia Bulldogs basketball coaches
Marshall Thundering Herd men's basketball coaches
Minnesota Golden Gophers men's basketball coaches
People from Ledyard, Connecticut
Radford Highlanders men's basketball coaches
Sportspeople from New London, Connecticut
Tennessee Tech Golden Eagles men's basketball coaches
Tulsa Golden Hurricane men's basketball coaches
UNC Greensboro Spartans men's basketball coaches
University of Tulsa alumni
VCU Rams men's basketball coaches
Virginia Commonwealth University alumni